HVD may refer to:
 High-voltage differential signaling, an electrical signalling method
 Hosted Virtual Desktop, a type of computer desktop virtualization
 High-Definition Versatile Disc, a DVD format
 Holographic Versatile Disc, an optical disc technology
 High-value detention site, a type of United States military prison
 Humanistischer Verband Deutschlands, a German humanist organization
 Khovd Airport, in Mongolia